Lliswerry Association Football Club is an association football club based in the Lliswerry area of the city of Newport, South Wales. They currently play in the Ardal South East league, tier 3 of the Welsh pyramid system. They have in the past played in the Welsh Football League, the previous tier 3.

History
The club was original formed in 1926, but after a break from senior football reformed in 1977, progressing through the divisions of the Newport and District Football League. In the early 1980s the club joined the Gwent County League with promotion to the Welsh Football League achieved in 2013.

The 2021–22 season saw the club go win the Gwent County Premier Division which entitled the club to promotion to the tier 3 Ardal Leagues pending the outcome of their tier three Certification application to the Football Association of Wales, which was awarded in May 2022.

Honours
The clubs honours include:
Gwent County League Premier Division – Champions: 2021–22
Gwent County League Division One – Champions: 2012–13
Gwent County League Division Two – Champions: 1985–86
Gwent County Amateur Cup – Winners: 2011–12, 2012–13
Gwent County Challenge Cup – Winners: 1990–91, 1993–94
Newport and District Football League Senior Bowl – Winners: 1977–78
Newport and District Football League Premier 'X' – Champions: 1978–79, 1983–84
Newport and District Football League Premier 'Y' – Champions: 1985–86, 2003–04
Newport and District Football League First Division – Champions: 2009–10
Newport and District Football League Division 2A – Champions: 1978–79, 1990–91

References

Football clubs in Wales
Football clubs in Newport, Wales
Gwent County League clubs
Welsh Football League clubs
1926 establishments in Wales
1977 establishments in Wales
Association football clubs established in 1926
Association football clubs established in 1977
Newport and District League clubs
Ardal Leagues clubs